Martins  may refer to:

Names
 Martins (surname)
 Mārtiņš, a Latvian masculine given name
 Martins Amaewhule, Nigerian politician
 Martins Azubuike, Nigerian politician
 Martins Babale (b. 1959), Nigerian politician
 Martins Dukurs (b. 1984), Latvian skeleton racer
 Martins Ekwueme (b. 1985), Nigerian-born Polish soccer player
 Martins Igbanu (b. 1997), Nigerian basketball player
 Martins Imhangbe (b. 1991), British-Nigerian actor
 Martins Licis (b. 1990), Latvian-American strongman
 Martins Pena (1815–1848), Brazilian playwright

Places
 Martins, Rio Grande do Norte, Brazil
 Martins (Martti), fourth district of Turku, Finland
 Martins Bank Building, Liverpool, UK
 Martins Bay, Fiordland, New Zealand
 Martins Creek (disambiguation)
 Martins Ferry, California, US
 Martins Ferry, Ohio, US
 Martins Ferry High School
 Martins Fork Lake, Kentucky, US
 Martins Head, Antarctica
 Martins Heron, Berkshire, England, UK
 Martins Heron railway station
 Martins Point, Nova Scotia, Canada
 Martins Pond, Massachusetts, USA
 Martins Pond Site, Maryland, USA
 Martins Run, Ohio, USA
 Martins Soares, Minas Gerais, Brazil
 Martins Store, Virginia, USA
 Martins Trailer Court, Alberta, Canada
 Pinto Martins International Airport, in Fortaleza, Ceará, Brazil

Other
 Jerónimo Martins, Portugal-based company
 Martin (bird) are passerine birds akin to swallows
 Mārtiņš (Latvian god), god who protected the Latvian people
 Martins Bank, former London private bank
 Martins Ferry Times Leader, newspaper
 Martins Motorsports, American stock car racing team]]
 Martins Tagebuch, 1955 East German film

See also
 Martin (disambiguation)
 Martin's (disambiguation)
 Marten
 Martínez (surname), a Spanish surname equivalent to Portuguese patronymic